is a former freestyle swimmer from Japan, who represented his native country at the 1952 Summer Olympics in Helsinki, Finland. There he won a silver medal as a member of the 4 × 200 m freestyle relay team, alongside Yoshihiro Hamaguchi, Hiroshi Suzuki and Teijiro Tanikawa.

Goto was born in Fukuoka.

References
databaseOlympics

1934 births
Living people
Japanese male freestyle swimmers
Swimmers at the 1952 Summer Olympics
Olympic swimmers of Japan
Olympic silver medalists for Japan
World record setters in swimming
Medalists at the 1952 Summer Olympics
Olympic silver medalists in swimming